Christ the King Catholic Voluntary Academy (formerly Christ The King School) is a mixed Roman Catholic secondary school and sixth form located in Arnold, a town in the English ceremonial county of Nottinghamshire. It is one of three Catholic secondary schools in the Greater Nottingham area, along with The Becket School and Trinity School. It was opened in 1972

Previously a voluntary aided school administered by the Roman Catholic Diocese of Nottingham and Nottinghamshire County Council, Christ The King School was converted to with academy status on 1 October 2012 and was renamed Christ the King Catholic Voluntary Academy, becoming part of the Pax Christi Multi-Academy Trust. This was later merged into the Our Lady of Lourdes Multi-Academy Trust.

Christ the King Catholic Voluntary Academy offers GCSEs, BTECs and Cambridge Nationals as programmes of study for pupils, while students in the sixth form have the option to study from a range of A Levels and further BTECs.

In 2012 the school undertook a large redevelopment of one building. In 2012, the lower building include Technology and Computer Rooms) was redecorated, and a lift was installed. In 2015 the school built a new Physical Education area, and the old PE area was converted into offices. In 2016, a new extension to the sixth form centre at Christ the King was constructed with study space for students with computer access.

In December 2019 principal Carlo Cuomo had handed his notice in with 10 years service to the school as principal and moved onto the next chapter of his teaching career as principal at All Saints CVA in Mansfield. With his departure vice principal Joanne Love took the school as acting head until a replacement but in January 2020 she was announced as the new principal.

Organisation 
The school is organised into five houses which are named after notable Christian pilgrimage sites in the UK.

 Iona
 Canterbury
 Holywell
 Lindisfarne
 Walsingham

Notable events 
In 2013, while on a school-organised skiing trip to Austria, teacher Jonathan Taylor died in a tragic accident after falling down a bank. The coroner later recorded a verdict of accidental death.

In January 2016, a substance in the science preparation laboratory was found to be incorrectly stored and had dried out and become explosive. Immediate professional help was obtained and the substance was destroyed by the armed forces.

Alumni 

 Jordan Bowery
 Alex Iacovitti
 Brian Kilcline
 Cieron Keane
 Greg Tempest
 MistaJam

References

External links

Secondary schools in Nottinghamshire
Catholic secondary schools in the Diocese of Nottingham
Academies in Nottinghamshire